Jacques Gerschwiler (10 September 1898 – 4 May 2000) was a Swiss figure skater and coach. Among his students were Cecilia Colledge, Jeannette Altwegg, Sally Stapleford, Bridget Adams, Barbara Wyatt, and Jacqueline Harbord.

Born in Arbon, Switzerland, he was the half-brother of Arnold Gerschwiler and the uncle of Hans Gerschwiler. He died in Geneva at the age of 101. He was elected to the World Figure Skating Hall of Fame. The brothers were inducted into the Professional Skaters Association's Coaches Hall of Fame in 2004.

References

Swiss figure skaters
Swiss figure skating coaches
Swiss centenarians
Men centenarians
1898 births
2000 deaths
People from Arbon
Sportspeople from Thurgau